The Grove, also known as The Children's Advocacy Center of Bristol and Washington County, is a historic home located just outside Bristol in Washington County, Virginia. It was built in 1857, on the Walnut Grove tract.  It is a two-story, five-bay, brick Greek Revival style dwelling with a kitchen wing.  The house has a gable roof and features a two-story wood-framed front porch.

It was listed on the National Register of Historic Places in 2002.

References

External links
Children's Advocacy Center of Bristol and Washington County website

Houses on the National Register of Historic Places in Virginia
Greek Revival houses in Virginia
Houses completed in 1857
Houses in Washington County, Virginia
National Register of Historic Places in Washington County, Virginia
1857 establishments in Virginia